
Year 454 BC was a year of the pre-Julian Roman calendar. At the time, it was known as the Year of the Consulship of Capitolinus and Varus (or, less frequently, year 300 Ab urbe condita). The denomination 454 BC for this year has been used since the early medieval period, when the Anno Domini calendar era became the prevalent method in Europe for naming years.

Events 
 By place 

 Persian Empire 
 Persian rule in Egypt is finally restored by Megabyzus, satrap of Syria, after a prolonged struggle which has included dealing with a military intervention by Athens. The leader of the revolt, Inaros, is crucified by the Persians.

 India 

 Mahavira attains Kevala Jnana at the age of 43, according to the Sweetámbara branch of Jain philosophy.

 Greece 
 Pericles leads a naval expedition in the Corinthian Gulf, in which Athens defeats Achaea. He then attacks Sicyon and Acarnania, after which he unsuccessfully tries to take Oeniadea on the Corinthian Gulf, before returning to Athens.
 Pericles declares that the Delian League's considerable treasury at Delos is not safe from the Persian navy and has the treasury transferred to Athens, thus strengthening Athens' power over the League.

 Roman Republic 
 The Roman Plebs, suffering from a number of economic and financial ills, force the city’s patricians to begin the reform and codification of the law. As a first act, a three-man commission is sent to Athens to study that city's laws.

 Sicily 
 Hostilities between Segesta and Selinunte, two Greek cities on Sicily, take place over access to the Tyrrhenian Sea.

Births

Deaths 
Alexander I of Macedon

References